Munditiella kirai is a species of small sea snail, a marine gastropod mollusk in the family Skeneidae.

Distribution
This species occurs in the Pacific Ocean off  Japan.

References

 Higo, S., Callomon, P. & Goto, Y. (1999) Catalogue and Bibliography of the Marine Shell-Bearing Mollusca of Japan. Elle Scientific Publications, Yao,  Japan, 749 pp.

kirai
Gastropods described in 1961